The Command teaching style is the closest approximation to the traditional system of education under the progressive teaching technology, Student-Directed Teaching. As part of the five distinct teaching styles developed by Don Green, Command is the most readily understood by many students, as it is most similar to what they are used to from the public system. As Green describes it,

The Command teaching style is for those students whose learning characteristics require formal instruction and a specific assignment for the practice to be appropriate for the student to master the objective. These students need to be directed as to what they will do during the class time allocated to the specific subject being studied.

Description 
Under the Command teaching style, the teacher will:

Provide a unit plan consisting of the objectives for several days, written in a language that students can understand
Provide formal instruction
Limit formal instruction to 25% of the time
Provide an instruction area
Assign an appropriate amount of practice related to the instruction
Provide a checking station with answer keys
Use good questioning techniques and negotiation to help steer the students to becoming more independent
Spend approximately 60% of the total class time with the students whose choice is Command
Provide perception checks and final tests as indicated in the unit plan
Provide a second evaluative activity, if required by an individual student

Alternatively, the student will:

Listen to the instruction
Do the assigned work
Declare the mark expected on each perception check
Do more than one perception check if the declared mark is not reached within the flexibility factor

Students who choose Command traditionally exhibit the following characteristics:

Lack self-motivation
Lack the ability to make good decisions about their learning
Lack the ability to focus on a task for any extended length of time
Lack the skills necessary to be successful in the subject being studied without teacher intervention
Underachieve according to some external standard
Are not risk takers

References

Pedagogy